"Hello, I Love You" is a song recorded by American rock band the Doors for their 1968 album Waiting for the Sun. Elektra Records released it as a single that same year, which topped the charts in the U.S. and Canada. Although the Doors are credited as the songwriters, songs by other artists have been identified as likely sources.

Apart from the single's success, a portion of the band's fans have dismissed the tune, perceiving it does not represent the Doors sound, due to its commercial nature and shallow lyrics, while also being the subject of plagiarism controversy.

Composition
"Hello, I Love You" was written and first recorded in 1965. It was one of six songs recorded by Rick & the Ravens (a forerunner of the Doors) at World Pacific Jazz studios that the group used to try to secure a record deal. The lyrics were inspired by a young black girl whom Jim Morrison saw at Venice Beach: "Do you hope to pluck this dusky jewel".

Both the single and Waiting for the Sun liner notes list the song as a group composition; the performance rights organization ASCAP shows the writers as each of the individual Doors members. The majority of the track's structure is notated in the key of A Major.

Plagiarism controversy
In the liner notes to The Doors: Box Set, Robby Krieger denied allegations that the song's musical structure was stolen from Ray Davies, where a riff similar to it is featured in the Kinks' "All Day and All of the Night".  Instead, Krieger said the song's drum beat was taken from Cream's song "Sunshine of Your Love".  But Davies commented in a 2012 interview with Mojo magazine:
 
In a 2014 interview with Rolling Stone, Davies suggested that an out-of-court settlement had been reached with the Doors. Keyboardist Ray Manzarek, admitted in an interview with Musician magazine that it was "a lot like a Kinks song."

Release and charts

Stereo single 
At the time the single was released, stereo 45 rpm records were generally unknownespecially in the Top 40 format.  This recording by the Doors was promoted as one of the first rock 45 rpm records in stereo.  It includes a long musical sweep about 1:20 into the song, starting at the left channel and panning across into the right channel, in a very ostentatious demonstration of stereo effect.  This release, along with the Rascals' hit song, "A Beautiful Morning", are credited with initiating the industry changeover to stereo recordings as the norm for 45 rpm singles.  Early American pressings of the single used the title "Hello I Love You Won’t You Tell Me Your Name".

Charts and certifications 
The song spent two weeks at No. 1 and was also in the Top 5 at the same time as Jose Feliciano's version of "Light My Fire". This put two of the Doors' tunes simultaneously in the Top 5. The single was declared by Billboard as a "solid dance beat throughout." Cash Box said that it is "a steady paced blues track with explosive close (and a stereo gimmick)." On its first appearance on the Canadian charts it was listed under the B-side title.

Weekly charts

Year-end charts

Certifications

References

The Doors songs
1968 singles
Billboard Hot 100 number-one singles
Cashbox number-one singles
RPM Top Singles number-one singles
Songs involved in plagiarism controversies
Songs written by John Densmore
Songs written by Robby Krieger
Songs written by Ray Manzarek
Songs written by Jim Morrison
Song recordings produced by Paul A. Rothchild
1968 songs
Elektra Records singles